Swahili may refer to:
 Swahili language, a Bantu language official in Kenya, Tanzania and Uganda and widely spoken in the African Great Lakes
 Swahili people, an ethnic group in East Africa
 Swahili culture, the culture of the Swahili people
 Swahili coast, a littoral region in East Africa

Language and nationality disambiguation pages